On 20 July 1974, the armed forces of Turkey invaded the northern portion of the Republic of Cyprus in response to the Greek military junta-backed 1974 Cypriot coup d'état that took place on the island against the country's democratically elected president, Archbishop Makarios III. The initial phase of the Turkish invasion, commonly referred to as "Attila-1", lasted until 24 July 1974, after which the offensive faltered and a ground war ensued.

On 14 August 1974, the Turkish armed forces in northern Cyprus had been sufficiently reinforced to the extent that they were able to launch a second major offensive, "Attila-2", which expanded the area under its control to approximately 38% of the land mass by 18 August 1974 and the end of hostilities by cease fire.

Attila 1 Offensive (20–23 July 1974)

20 July 1974

21 July 1974

22 July 1974

23 July 1974

Clashes from 24 July to 13 August

1 August

2 August

6 August

Attila 2 Offensive (14–18 August 1974)

14 August

15 August

16 August

See also 
 Military operations during the Invasion of Cyprus (1974)
 Timeline of the 1974 Invasion of Cyprus
 Cypriot National Guard
 Cyprus Navy and Marine Police
 List of equipment of the Cypriot National Guard
 Cyprus dispute

References

Turkish invasion of Cyprus
1974 in Cyprus